Domingos Augusto Alves da Costa Oliveira  (31 July 1873, Lisbon – 24 December 1957, Lisbon) was a Portuguese general and politician. 

He was nominated, on 21 January 1930, Prime Minister of Portugal (President of the Council of Ministers) during the period of the Ditadura Nacional (National Dictatorship) that preceded the Estado Novo (New State). A conservative, he opposed all the attempts to restore democracy, like the failed military uprising of April and May 1931 in Madeira and the Azores Islands. The popularity and political role demonstrated by the Finance Minister, António de Oliveira Salazar, led him to resign on 25 June 1932, to be replaced by Salazar, who would retain the post for the following 36 years.

1873 births
1957 deaths
People from Lisbon
Portuguese military officers
Prime Ministers of Portugal
Recipients of the Order of the Tower and Sword